The 2020–21 North Carolina Tar Heels women's basketball team represented the University of North Carolina at Chapel Hill during the 2020–21 NCAA Division I women's basketball season. The Tar Heels, were led by second year head coach Courtney Banghart, played their games at Carmichael Arena, and are members of the Atlantic Coast Conference.

The Tar Heels finished the season 13–11 and 8–9 in ACC play to finish in eight place.  In the ACC tournament, they lost to Wake Forest in the Second Round.  They received an at-large bid to the NCAA tournament where they were the ten seed in the HemisFair Regional.  In the tournament they lost to Alabama in the First Round to end their season.

Previous season
For the 2019–20 season, the Tar Heels finished 16–14 and 7–11 in ACC play to finish in a tie for eleventh place.  As the twelfth seed in the ACC tournament, they lost to Wake Forest in the First Round.  The NCAA tournament and WNIT were cancelled due to the COVID-19 outbreak.

Off-season

Departures

Incoming transfers

Recruiting Class

Source:

Roster

Schedule

Source

|-
!colspan=6 style="background:#56A0D3; color:#FFFFFF;"| Non-conference Regular Season

|-
!colspan=6 style="background:#56A0D3; color:#FFFFFF;"| ACC Regular Season

|-
!colspan=6 style="background:#56A0D3;"| ACC Women's Tournament

|-
!colspan=6 style="background:#56A0D3;"| NCAA Women's Tournament

Rankings

See also
2020–21 North Carolina Tar Heels men's basketball team

References

North Carolina Tar Heels women's basketball seasons
North Carolina
North Carolina women's basketball
North Carolina women's basketball
North Carolina